Dichagyris melanura is a moth of the family Noctuidae. It is found from south-eastern Europe to Turkey, the Caucasus region, north Iran, Israel, Syria and Jordan.

Adults are on wing from May to July. There is one generation per year.

Subspecies
Dichagyris melanura melanura (Yugoslavia)
Dichagyris melanura albida (the shores of Black Sea in Romania and Bulgaria))
Dichagyris melanura dufayi (Greece)
Dichagyris melanura vera (Turkestan, Caucasus, Armenia, Turkey, Syria, Lebanon, Iraq, Iran)
Dichagyris melanura roseotincta (Israel)

External links
 Noctuinae of Israel

melanura
Moths of Europe
Moths of Asia
Moths described in 1846